Artenacian culture, named after the archaeological site of Artenac in Charente, appeared in the Late Chalcolithic, c. 2400 BC, apparently as reaction to migrations of Danubian peoples into Western France.

Because it is characterized by its abundant arrow points, it is considered a culture of bowmen. It participated fully in the megalithic culture of the Chalcolithic period.

In successive centuries it became dominant throughout western France, establishing a stable ethno-cultural border with the Danubian culture near the Rhine that remained stable for a whole millennium.

The Artenacian peoples are believed to be the ancestors of the historical Aquitani.

Gallery

Notes

Archaeological cultures of Western Europe
Chalcolithic cultures of Europe
Archaeological cultures in France